Rorainópolis is a municipality located in the southernmost point of the state of Roraima in Brazil. Its population is 30,782 (as of 2020) and its area is 33,594 km². The municipality is crossed by the equator.

History
In the 1970s, the regional headquarters of INCRA were established in Rorainópolis along the BR-174 highway. INCRA started to distribute land which attracted settlers from all of Brazil. In 1988, the name was changed from Vila do Incra to Rorainópolis. In 1995, Rorainópolis became an independent municipality, and has become the second most populous of the state of Roraima. The  operates a campus at Roraima.

Nature 
The Anauá National Forest is a  national forest in Rorainópolis. It is a protected area with sustainable use of natural resources established in 2005. The Baixo Rio Branco-Jauaperi Extractive Reserve is a  protected area which has a shared use agreement with Waimiri Atroari Indigenous Territory. It has been established in 2018.

The nature in Rorainópolis is under threat from palm oil plantations. Palmaplan has as of 2021, bought 30,000 hectares of land. The cattle ranchers are eager to sell their land, and deforest new areas.

Villages 
 Santa Maria do Boiaçu

References

External links 
 Official site (in Portuguese)
 

Municipalities in Roraima
Populated places established in 1995